Loreta may refer to:

 Loreta, Wisconsin, an unincorporated community in the town of Bear Creek, Sauk County, Wisconsin, United States
 Loreta (Prague), a pilgrimage destination in Hradčany, a district of Prague, Czech Republic
 Loreta (actress), Iranian Armenian stage and film actress
 Loreta (given name), a feminine given name

See also
 Loreto (disambiguation)